The Canton of Barneville-Carteret in France is a former canton situated in the department of Manche and the region of Basse-Normandie. It had 7,623 inhabitants (2012). Its seat was the commune of Barneville-Carteret. It was disbanded following the French canton reorganisation which came into effect in March 2015. It consisted of 14 communes, which joined the canton of Les Pieux in 2015.

The canton comprised the following communes:

Barneville-Carteret
Baubigny
Fierville-les-Mines
La Haye-d'Ectot
Le Mesnil
Les Moitiers-d'Allonne
Portbail
Saint-Georges-de-la-Rivière
Saint-Jean-de-la-Rivière
Saint-Lô-d'Ourville
Saint-Maurice-en-Cotentin
Saint-Pierre-d'Arthéglise
Sénoville
Sortosville-en-Beaumont

References

Barneville-Carteret
2015 disestablishments in France
States and territories disestablished in 2015